Mark E. Smith is a major general and the 24th National Commander of the Civil Air Patrol. Maj Gen Smith succeeded Maj Gen Joseph Vazquez as National Commander on September 2, 2017. He led over 63,000 members across the U.S. in fulfilling CAP's congressionally chartered missions of Emergency Services, Cadet Programs and Aerospace Education, including Homeland Security as the newest member of the Air Force’s Total Force. He was previously the Southwest Region Commander and New Mexico Wing Commander.

Education
United States Air Force Academy - Bachelor's of Science in International Affairs
Air Force Squadron Officer School
Air Command and Staff College
Air War College
Embry Riddle Aeronautical University - Master's of Aviation Management 
Olivet Nazarene University - Doctor of Education in Ethical Leadership

Military and private work experience
General Smith retired as a Colonel from the U.S. Air Force in 2000 after 26 years of service. A veteran of Operation Desert Shield/Desert Storm, he later commanded the 27th Fighter Squadron at Langley Air Force Base, Virginia. Later he served as Director of the Office of the Secretary of Defense's Joint Advanced Distributed Simulation Joint Test and Evaluation (JADS JT&E) program.

In the private sector, General Smith worked at senior levels for both small and large corporations and as a private consultant. He also served as an International Test and Evaluation Association (ITEA) board member and as the first chair of the Simulation Interoperability Standards Organization's Executive Committee.

Civil Air Patrol
General Smith began in Civil Air Patrol in 2005. He is a CAP pilot and served in command positions within all levels of the organization. As Region Commander, he led CAP's Leadership Development Working Group, a national-level team that has developed products, tools and courses to better equip CAP's leaders. This group was responsible for the Unit Commander's (UCC) Course.

General Smith was appointed by the Civil Air Patrol Board of Governors on June 18, 2017 to a three-year term as National Commander/CEO which commenced on September 2, 2017. As National Commander, he was the highest-ranking CAP officer and served as Civil Air Patrol's Chief Executive Officer and as an advisor to the CAP Board of Governors, the organization's governing body. General Smith also led the CAP Command Council and the CAP Senior Advisory Group (CSAG). On August 8, 2019, CAP's Board of Governors extended General Smith's three-year term for one additional year. Major general Edward Phelka succeeded general Smith as National Commander on August 26, 2021.

Commands held
CAP National Commander (September 2, 2017 – August 26, 2021)
Southwest Region Commander (June 27, 2015 – September 1, 2017)
New Mexico Wing Commander (June 27, 2011 – June 29, 2015)
New Mexico Wing Vice Commander (2010 - 2011)
Albuquerque Heights Composite Squadron Commander (January 13, 2006 – April 1, 2008)
27th Fighter Squadron

USAF awards and decorations

See also
National Commander of the Civil Air Patrol

References

Living people
National Commanders of the Civil Air Patrol
United States Air Force officers
Year of birth missing (living people)